The 2012 Runnymede Borough Council election took place on 3 May 2012 to elect members of the Runnymede Borough District Council. The Conservative Party won 12 of the seats and the local Runnymede Independent Residents' Group won 2; both parties held onto their seats from the 2011 elections.

Election result

Ward results

References

2012 English local elections
2012
2010s in Surrey